The Democratic Nationhood Party was a political party in Indonesia. It was established in 2002 as the United Democratic Nationhood Party by a group of intellectuals including Ryaas Rasyid and Andi Mallarangeng, formerly president Susilo Bambang Yudhoyono's spokesman, who were disatissfied with the progress of the reform movement following the Fall of Suharto.

In the 2004 Indonesian legislative election, the party won 1.2% of the popular vote and 5 out of 550 seats. In the 2009 elections, the party stood as the Democratic Nationhood Party. The party set itself a target of 4 million votes in the election, in which it stood on a platform of creating a transparent, accountable and efficient administration. In the 2009 legislative election, the party won 0.6 percent of the vote, less than the 2.5 percent electoral threshold, meaning it lost its seats in the People's Representative Council. Following its poor result in the 2009 vote, the party joined nine other smaller parties to form the National Unity Party.

References

2002 establishments in Indonesia
Defunct political parties in Indonesia
Pancasila political parties
Political parties established in 2002
Political parties with year of disestablishment missing